Şaziye Moral (1903 – 9 April 1985) was a Turkish female stage and film actress and voice actress. She was the second Muslim stage actress in Turkey.

Early years
Şaziye Moral was born to ethnic Turkish parents in Kardzali, Bulgaria in 1903. Her mother died during her birth, and her father died after a couple of years. After the Balkan Wars (1912–1913), she moved to Istanbul, then Ottoman Empire, by mingling in (with the Rumelian immigrants. She was raised by her relatives. She completed the primary and middle school in Kocamustafapaşa, Istanbul. She dropped out the high school in the last grade, and started to earn money in order not to be a burden to her relatives.

Acting career
She entered as a clerk in an agency dealing with general services in Beyazıt, Istanbul, which ran its own theatre "Yeni Hayat Tiyatrosu" (literally "New Life Theatre"). The theatre folded and after some time  the actors left. For its re-establishment, she was offered to go on stage. She accepted the offer at a time when Muslim women actors were uncommon. Her acting career began in 1919 with her first performance in Cemal Yakup's play Kıtık Kalp ("Broken Hearth"). She was taken to the police station by a group of people, and sued for appearing on stage as a Muslim woman. She was acquitted in the court. She then went on a tour in Anatolia. After her return to Istanbul, she entered Istanbul City Theatres. In 1921, the City Theatres announced that Muslim women were officially not allowed to perform acting on stage. She became the second Muslim stage actress after Afife Jale (1902–1941).

After performing in more than two hundred plays on stage and acting in more than eighty movies, she retired in 1977.

Death
Şaziye Moral died in Istanbul at the age of 82 on 9 April 1985. She was interred at Zincirlikuyu Cemetery following a memorial held at the Harbiye Muhsin Ertuğrul Stage and the religious funeral service at Şişli Mosque.

Filmography

References

External links

1903 births
People from Kardzhali
Bulgarian people of Turkish descent
Bulgarian emigrants to Turkey
Bulgarian Turks in Turkey
Turkish stage actresses
Turkish film actresses
Turkish voice actresses
1985 deaths
Burials at Zincirlikuyu Cemetery